Trepidus may refer to:
 Trepidation
 Trepidus (music), piano piece of the composer Louis Andriessen